Blackford Bridge, also known as Pucketts Hole Bridge, is a historic Pratt through truss bridge located near Lebanon, Russell County, Virginia. It was built by the Groton Bridge Company in 1889.

The bridge was listed on the National Register of Historic Places in 2010.

See also
List of bridges on the National Register of Historic Places in Virginia

References

Road bridges on the National Register of Historic Places in Virginia
Bridges completed in 1889
Buildings and structures in Russell County, Virginia
National Register of Historic Places in Russell County, Virginia
Pratt truss bridges in the United States
Metal bridges in the United States